Terry Callan (born 30 August 1938) is a former Australian rules footballer who played with Geelong in the Victorian Football League (VFL).

Callan, a back pocket, played his early football with Geelong Amateurs and Old Xaverians. After making seven appearances in his debut season, Callan played 17 games for Geelong in 1961. He also represented Victoria at interstate football in 1961.

He was a regular fixture in the side again in 1962 and played in Geelong's drawn preliminary final against Carlton and preliminary final replay, which they lost.

Callan appeared in the opening 17 rounds of the 1963 VFL season. On 6 July 1963 he was a member of the Geelong team that were comprehensively and unexpectedly beaten by Fitzroy, 9.13 (67) to 3.13 (31) in the 1963 Miracle Match. A knee injury kept him out of the finals series and cost him a place in Geelong's sixth premiership team.

After having an operation on his knee to remove the strained cartilage, he returned to the side in 1964 and played three games, but continued to be troubled by his knee.
 
He is the father of former Geelong and Western Bulldogs player Tim Callan.

See also
 1963 Miracle Match

References

1938 births
Australian rules footballers from Victoria (Australia)
Geelong Football Club players
Old Xaverians Football Club players
Living people